CharProtDB is a curated database of biochemically characterized proteins.

References

External links
 

Biological databases
Protein classification